Otostigmus astenus is a species of centipede in the Scolopendridae family. It was first described in 1878 by E. Köhlrausch.

Distribution
The species has been recorded from Australia, Melanesia, the Philippines and Indonesia, as well as from some Pacific and Indian Ocean islands.

Behaviour
The centipedes are solitary terrestrial predators that inhabit plant litter, soil and rotting wood.

References

 

 
astenus
Centipedes of Australia
Fauna of Queensland
Arthropods of New Guinea
Arthropods of Indonesia
Arthropods of the Philippines
Animals described in 1878